Erik Zenga (born 18 January 1993) is a professional footballer who plays for SV Sandhausen as a defensive midfielder. Born in Russia, he has represented Germany at youth level.

International career
Zenga was born to a Russian mother and an Angolan father, coming to Germany as a child, and is eligible for all three national teams. Zenga was a youth international for Germany.

References

External links
 
 

1991 births
Living people
People from Kostroma
Association football midfielders
German footballers
Germany youth international footballers
Russian footballers
Naturalized citizens of Germany
German people of Russian descent
German people of Angolan descent
Russian people of Angolan descent
Bayer 04 Leverkusen II players
VfL Osnabrück players
SC Preußen Münster players
SV Sandhausen players
2. Bundesliga players
3. Liga players
Regionalliga players
Sportspeople from Kostroma Oblast